Immit may refer to:
IMMIT or International Master in Management of Information Technology
Immit, Pakistan, village in Ishkoman Valley, Pakistan